Grzegorz Nowak may refer to:

Grzegorz Nowak (conductor) (born 1951), Polish conductor
Grzegorz Nowak (rower) (born 1954), Polish rower